The Central Organisation for Railway Electrification (CORE) is an organizational unit of Indian Railways responsible for railway electrification of the Indian Railways network. The organisation, founded in 1979, is headquartered in Prayagraj, Uttar Pradesh, India. Project units operate in Ambala, Bangalore, Chennai, Secunderabad, Lucknow, Ahmedabad, Jaipur, Danapur, and New Jalpaiguri.

CORE headquarters has Electrical, Signal and Telecommunications (S&T), Civil Engineering, Stores, Personnel, Vigilance and Finance departments. Railway Electrification project units, which are headed by Chief Project Directors.

Indian Railways has electrified 52,247 Route kilometers (RKM) that is about 83% of the total broad gauge network of Indian Railways (65,414 RKM, including Konkan Railway) by 31 March 2022. Indian Railway aims to electrify all of its broad gauge network by 31 March 2024. The entire electrified mainline rail network in India uses 25 kV AC; DC is used only for metros and trams.

History

1500 V DC
Railway electrification in India began with the first electric train (1500 V DC), between Bombay Victoria Terminus and Kurla on the Great Indian Peninsula Railway's (GIPR) Harbour Line, on 3 February 1925. Steep grades on the Western Ghats necessitated the introduction of electric traction on the GIPR to Igatpuri on the North East Line and to Pune on the South East Line. 1500 V DC traction was introduced on the suburban section of the Bombay, Baroda and Central India Railway between Colaba and Borivili on 5 January 1928, and between Madras Beach and Tambaram of the Madras and Southern Mahratta Railway on 11 May 1931, to meet growing traffic needs. The last sections of 1500 V DC in India, from Chhatrapati Shivaji Terminus, Mumbai to Panvel and Thane to Vashi, were upgraded to 25 kV AC in April 2016.

3000 V DC
The electrification of the Howrah-Burdwan section of the Eastern Railway zone at 3000 V DC was completed in 1958. The first 3000 V DC EMU service began on the Howrah-Sheoraphuli section on 14 December 1957. The last section of 3000 V DC in India, from Howrah to Burdwan, was upgraded to 25 kV AC in 1968.

25 kV AC

The 25 kV AC system emerged as an economical form of electrification as a result of research and trials in Europe, particularly on French Railways (SNCF). Indian Railways decided to adopt the 25 kV AC system of electrification as a standard in 1957, with SNCF their consultant in the early stages, later taken over by the "50 c/s Group". The joint venture was founded in 1954 by several European railway manufacturers and was dedicated to the development and construction of locomotives powered by 50 Hz alternating current. It arranged the supply contracts for the WAM-1, WAG-1 and WAG-3 locomotives and their spare parts. 

The first section electrified with the 25 kV AC system was Raj Kharswan–Dongoaposi, on the South Eastern Railway zone, on 15 December 1959 and first electric train run. The first 25 kV AC EMUs, for Kolkata suburban service, was introduced in September 1962.

Organization
The electrification office was established in Calcutta as Project Office for Railway Electrification (PORE) in 1951 when electrification of the Howrah–Burdwan section of the Eastern Railway was begun. A general manager headed the Railway Electrification Organization, established in Calcutta in 1959. In 1961, the Northern Railway zone electrification office (headed by an engineer-in-chief) was established in Allahabad for the electrification of the Mughalsarai–New Delhi section. In accordance with the 1978 J. Raj Committee report, a number of electrification projects were included and a railway-electrification headquarters established. Since most of the electrification projects were in Central and South India, the electrification headquarters was established in Nagpur under an additional general manager from 1982 to 1984. The headquarters was moved to Allahabad under the additional general manager in January 1985 and was renamed Central Organization for Railway Electrification (CORE). A general manager was appointed in July 1987.

Electrification progress

Status

Note:
Total (BG + MG + NG) rkm: 73361 route km
Total Electrification %: 80.20%

Note:
Total (BG + MG + NG) rkm: 68155 route km
Total Electrification %: 85%

Modernisation

Equipment
To reduce maintenance costs and improve the reliability of power-supply systems, CORE has adopted state-of-the-art technology: cast resin transformers, SF6 circuit breakers or vacuum switchgear, long-creepage solid-core insulators and PTFE-neutral sections. Eight-wheeled, self-propelled OHE inspection cars have been introduced to improve maintenance, and an OHE recording car has been requested to monitor the performance of overhead equipment.

SCADA
It is remotely controlled from the division control centre to ensure an uninterrupted power supply to the track overhead equipment. In electrification projects, a microprocessor-based supervisory control and data acquisition control system is replacing the earlier electro-mechanical Strowger system of remote-control equipment. SCADA can telemeter voltage, current, maximum demand and power factor on a real-time basis, enabling control of maximum demand and electrical cost. The system also provides automatic troubleshooting and isolation of faulty sections.

Other organisations involved in electrification
Some electrification projects have been entrusted to other agencies like RVNL (2624 RKM), IRCON (170 RKM), PGCIL (597 RKM) and RITES (170 RKM) under the Ministry of Railways and small electrification projects are carried out by zonal railways.

See also

 Future of rail transport in India
 List of railway electrification systems
 Project Unigauge

References

External links

CORE website at the Internet Archive

Government agencies of India
Railway companies of India
Railway electrification by country
Organisations based in Allahabad
Electric rail transport in India
1961 establishments in Uttar Pradesh
Modi administration initiatives